Rákóczi Stadion is a multi-use stadium in Kaposvár, Hungary.  It is currently used mostly for football matches and is the home stadium of Kaposvári Rákóczi FC.  The stadium is able to hold 7,000 people.  It has 4,500 seats.

External links
Stadion Kaposvár Rákóczi at magyarfutball.hu

Buildings and structures in Kaposvár
Football venues in Hungary
Buildings and structures in Somogy County